A psammophile is a plant or animal that prefers or thrives in sandy areas. Plant psammophiles are also known as psammophytes. They thrive in places such as the Arabian Peninsula and the Sahara. and also the dunes of coastal regions.

References

Extremophiles